Glod may refer to:

People
 Glöð, a legendary queen recorded in Þorsteins saga Víkingssonar
 Glod, a nickname bestowed upon Glenn Beck by Stephen Colbert
 Glod Glodsson, a fictional character in Terry Pratchett's novel Soul Music
 Desiree Glod (born 1982), volleyball player
 Paul Glod (1919–2004), American football player and coach

Places in Romania
 Glod, a village in Almașu Mare Commune, Alba County
 Glod, Dâmboviţa, a village in Moroeni Commune, Dâmboviţa County
 Glod, a village in Strâmtura Commune, Maramureș County
 Glod, a village in Lapoș Commune, Prahova County
 Glod, a village in Gâlgău Commune, Sălaj County
 Glod River, a tributary of the river Vulcana
 Glodu-Petcari, a village in Chiliile Commune, Buzău County

See also
 Gold